Badaia or Badaya  is a mountain range of the Basque Mountains, Spain; in the province of Álava. The Santa Catalina Botanical Garden is located at the foot of the range.

References

External links
 

Mountain ranges of the Basque Country (autonomous community)
Geography of Álava